Happy! may refer to:

 Happy!, a comic series by Grant Morrison, see Grant Morrison bibliography#Other US publishers
 Happy! (TV series), a Syfy television series based on the comics by Grant Morrison
 Happy! (sports manga), a Japanese sports manga

See also
 Happy (disambiguation)